Nationality words link to articles with information on the nation's poetry or literature (for instance, Irish or France).

Events
 September 16 – Chilean poet Víctor Jara, having been detained four days earlier as a political prisoner in Estadio Chile and tortured during the 1973 Chilean coup d'état, is shot and killed. His last poem Estadio Chile is preserved in memories and scraps of paper retained by fellow detainees.
 Canadian poet and author, Michael Ondaatje adapts his 1970 book of poetry, The Collected Works of Billy the Kid, into a play which this year is first produced in Stratford, Ontario; it will appear in New York in 1974 and in London, England in 1984.
 White Pine Press founded in Buffalo, New York. The publisher is a nonprofit organization putting out poetry, fiction, essays, and literature in translation.
 The journal L'éphémère a French journal founded in 1966, ceased publication this year; poets associated with it include Yves Bonnefoy, Jacques Dupin and André du Bouchet

Works published in English
Listed by nation where the work was first published and again by the poet's native land, if different; substantially revised works listed separately:

Australia
 John Tranter:
 Red Movie and other poems, Angus & Robertson
 The Blast Area, Gargoyle Poets number 13, Makar Press
 Chris Wallace-Crabbe:
 Selected Poems, Sydney: Angus & Robertson
 Vinyl record: Chris Wallace-Crabbe Reads From His Own Verse, St.Lucia

Canada
 Alfred Bailey, Thanks for a Drowned Island.
 Earle Birney:
 The Bear on the Delhi Road: selected poems. London: Chatto & Windus.
 what's so big about GREEN?. Toronto: McClelland and Stewart.
 Shirley Gibson, I Am Watching
John Glassco, Montreal.  Montreal: DC Books.
 Irving Layton, Lovers and lesser Men. Toronto: McClelland & Stewart.
 Dorothy Livesay, Nine Poems of Farewell. Windsor, ON: Black Moss Press.
 Eli Mandel, Crusoe: Poems Selected and New
 Miriam Mandel, Lions at Her Face. Edmonton: White Pelican Publications.
 John Metcalf (ed.), The Speaking Earth, anthology
 Michael Ondaatje, Rat Jelly, Toronto: Coach House Press
 Al Purdy, Sex and Death
 F. R. Scott, The Dance Is One. Toronto: McClelland and Stewart.
Raymond Souster, The Colour of the Times. Ten Elephants on Yonge Street. Toronto: McGraw-Hill Ryerson.
Raymond Souster and Richard Woollatt, eds. Sights and Sounds. Toronto: Macmillan.
Doris Huestis Speirs, Exercise for Psyche

Caribbean
 Mervyn Morris, The Pond, Jamaica
 Andrew Salkey (ed.), Breaklight, Doubleday, anthology
 Dennis Scott, Uncle Time, Jamaica
 Derek Walcott, Another Life, St. Lucia

India in English
 Kamala Das:
 The Old Playhouse and Other Poems, New Delhi: Orient Longman
 Alphabet of Love, New Delhi: Orient Paper Backs
 Richard L. Bartholomew, Poems, Calcutta: Writers Workshop, India .
 Brooks Frederick, Rocket to the Moon, Calcutta: Writers Workshop, India
 Alokeranjan Das Gupta, Poems, Calcutta: Dialogue Pub.
 A. K. Ramanujan, Speaking of Siva, Penguin

Ireland
 Patric Dickinson, A Wintering Tree, Irish poet published in the United Kingdom
 Seamus Heaney, a book of poetry, Northern Ireland native published in the United Kingdom
 Thomas Kinsella:
 Selected Poems 1956–1968, including "Chrysalides"
 New Poems 1973, including "Notes from the Land of the Dead"
 Paul Muldoon, New Weather, Northern Irish native published in the United Kingdom

New Zealand
 James K. Baxter, Two Obscene Poems, posthumous,
 Alan Brunton, Messengers in Blackface, work by a New Zealand poet published in the United Kingdom
 Allen Curnow, An Abominable Temper & Other Poems
 Winston Curnow (ed.), Essays on New Zealand Literature, Auckland: Heinemann Educational Books (scholarship)
 Keith Sinclair, The Firewheel Tree

United Kingdom
 Dannie Abse, Funland, and Other Poems
 Peter Ackroyd, London Lickpenny
 Martin Booth, Coronis, including the long poem, "On the Death of Archdeacon Broix"
 Edwin Brock, a book of poetry
 Alan Brunton, Messengers in Blackface, work by a New Zealand poet published in the United Kingdom
 Cal Clothier, Behind Heslington Hall
 Tony Curtis, Walk Down a Welsh Wind, Welsh
 Patric Dickinson, A Wintering Tree, Irish poet published in the United Kingdom
 Carol Ann Duffy, Fleshweathercock
 Lawrence Durrell, Vega, and Other Poems
 D. J. Enright, The Terrible Shears
 Elaine Feinstein, The Celebrants and Other Poems, Hutchinson
 Michael Fried, Powers
 Roy Fuller, Tiny Tears
 Geoffrey Grigson, Sad Grave of an Imperial Mongoose
 Michael Hamburger, Ownerless Earth
 Seamus Heaney, a book of poetry, Northern Irish native published in the United Kingdom
 Ted Hughes, Prometheus on his Crag
 Thomas Kinsella, a book of poetry Irish poet published in the United Kingdom
 Geoffrey Holloway, To Have Eyes
 Michael Longley, An Exploded View
 George MacBeth, Shrapnel
 Edwin Morgan, From Glasgow to Saturn
 Pete Morgan, The Grey Mare Being the Better Steed
 Paul Muldoon, New Weather, Northern Irish native published in the United Kingdom
 Brian Patten, The Unreliable Nightingale
 Peter Redgrove, a book of poetry
 Alan Ross, The Taj Express
 Anne Ridler, a book of poetry
 Carol Rumens, A Strange Girl in Bright Colours
 Vernon Scannell, The Winter Man
 Michael Schmidt, It Was My Tree
 Sydney Tremayne, Selected and New Poems
 Derek Walcott, Another Life

Anthologies
 Philip Larkin, The Oxford Book of Twentieth Century English Verse anthology of poets from the British Isles or who spent time there, 
 Jon Silkin (ed.), Poetry of the Committeed Individual
 John Bishop and Virginia Broadbent (eds), London Between the Lines
 Howard Sergeant (ed.), African Voices

United States
 Frank Bidart, Golden State
 Robert Bly, Sleepers Joining Hands
 Joseph Payne Brennan, A Sheaf of Snow Poems
 Joseph Brodsky: Poems, Ann Arbor, Michigan: Ardis Russian-American
 Victor Hernandez Cruz, Mainland
 Irving Feldman, Lost Originals
 Lawrence Ferlinghetti, Open Eye, Open Heart
 Allen Ginsberg, The Fall of America
 John Logan, The Anonymous Lover, including "New Poem" and "Heart to Heart Talk with My Liver"
 Robert Lowell:
 The Dolphin, containing 103 new poems
 History, containing 360 poems, including more than 80 new ones and many revised
 For Lizzie and Harriet, 67 old poems, all revised
 W. S. Merwin, Writings to an Unfinished Accompaniment, New York: Atheneum
 Joyce Carol Oates, Angel Fire
 George Quasha, Somapoetics
 Adrienne Rich, "Rape"
 Muriel Rukeyser, Breaking Open
 Patti Smith, Witt
 Mark Strand, The Story of Our Lives, Canadian native living in and published in the United States
 Alice Walker, Revolutionary Petunias and Other Poems

Anthologies
 George Quasha & Jerome Rothenberg, (eds.) America a Prophecy: A New Reading of American Poetry from Pre-Columbian Times to the Present (Random House/Viking)
 Ronald Gross & George Quasha, (eds.) Open Poetry: Four Anthologies of Expanded Poems (Simon & Schuster)

Works published in other languages
Listed by nation where the work was first published and again by the poet's native land, if different; substantially revised works listed separately:

French language

Canada
 Michel Bealieu:
 Variables
 Pulsions
 Yves-Gabriel Brunet, Poésies I, collected poems from 1958 to 1962
 Gilles Constantineau, Nouveaux Poèmes
 Roland Giguère, La Main au feu, collected poems from 1949 to 1968
 Gilbert Langevin:
 Les Ecrits de Zéro Legel
 Novembre
 Raymond LeBlanc, Cri de terre
 Luc Racine, Le Pays saint

France
 Conseil international des femmes, Anthologie de la poésie féminine mondiale, Saint-Germain-des-Prés
 Jean Daive, Fut bâti, about the author's friendship with Paul Celan; part memoir, part prose-poem; Gallimard
 Michel Deguy, Tombeau de du Bellay
 Georges-Emmanuel Clancier, Peut-Être une demeure
 Jean Loisy, Le Double Jeu
 Katia Granoff Méditerranée
 Eugene Guilleveic, Inclus
 Edmond Jabès, (El, ou le drier livre)
 Michel Leiris, Haut-mal
 François Pradelle, Les Naïves Amours
 Denis Roche, Le Mécrit
 Pierrette Sartin, Le Destin accepté
 Philippe Soupault, Poèmes et Poésies: 1917–1973, publisher: Grasset

German language

East Germany
 Wolf Biermann, a communist living in East Germany, he could only publish these works in the West:
 Für meine Genossen
 Deutschland: ein Wintermärchen, long satirical poem on the division of Germany

West Germany, Austria, Switzerland
 Peter Huchel, Gezähte Tage
 Marie Luise Kaschnitz, Kein Zauberspruch
 Eric Fried, Die Freiheit den Mund aufzumachen
 Günter Herburger, Operette
 J. P. Stössel, Friedenserklärung

India
In each section, listed in alphabetical order by first name:

Assamese
 Maheswar Neog, Pracya Sasanavali
 Nabakanta Barua, Mor Aru Prithivir ("Of Mine and the Earth")
 Narayan Bezbarua, Punaruthan
 Nilmani Phookan, Phuli Thaka Suryamukhi Phultor Phale, Guwahati, Assam: Guwahati Book Stall

Other in India
 Amrita Pritan, Kagaz te Kanvas, Punjabi
 K. Siva Reddy, Raktam Suryudu, Hyderabad: Jhari Poetry Circle, Telugu-language
 Yumlembam Ibomcha Singh, Sandrembi Thoraklo Nahum Ponjel Sabige, Imphal: V.I. Publications; Meitei language

Italy
 Eugenio Montale, Diario del '71 e del '72 (poetry) Milan: Arnoldo Mondadori Editore (a private edition of 100 copies was published in 1971)
 Almanacco dello Specchio for 1973, an anthology of poetry, including translated poetry
 Franco Fortini, Questo muro, collected poems from 1962 to 1972
 Pier Paolo Pasolini, Trasumanar e organizzar
 Libero De Libero, Scempio e lusinga, collected poems written from 1930 to 1956
 Marino Moretti, Le poverazze

Soviet Union
 M. Bazhan, The Spark from Uman Recollections (translated into Russian from Ukrainian), 1973
 P. Brovka, We Are Children of One Mother (translated into Russian from Belarusian)
 B. Istru, Pain of a Shadow (translated into Russian from Moldavian)
 R. Margiani, From the Book of Brotherhood (translated into Russian from Georgian)
 S. Orlov, Loyalty

Spanish language
 José Carlos Becerra, El otoño recorre las islas, collected poetry from 1960 to 1970, edited by José Emilio Pacheco and Gabriel Zaid
 Alfonso Calderón, Isla de los Bienaventurados ("Island of the Blessed"), Chile
 Matilde Camus, Bestiario poético ("Poetic Book of Aaimals")
 Ernesto Cardenal, Canto nacional, Nicaragua
 Rosario Castellanos, "Valium 10"
 Rafael Méndez Dorich, Globos cautivos, posthumously published (Lima), Peru
 Enrique Fierro, Mutaciones, Uruguay
 Ulalume González de León, Plagio, Uruguay
 Alvaro Mutis, Summa de magroll el Gaviero, Colombia
 José Miguel Oviedo, Estos trece
 José Emilio Pacheco, Irás y no volverás, Mexico
 Justo Jorge Padrón, Mar de la noche
 Gabriel Zaid, Práctica mortal, Mexico

Other
 Ruy de Moura Belo, Portugal:
 País possível ("The Possible Country"), consisting of a single, long poem, Pequena História Trágico-Trerrestre ("Brief Tragi-Terrestrial History")
 Transporte no tempo ("Borne through Time")
 Odysseus Elytis, The Trills Of Love (Τα Ρω του Έρωτα), Greece
 Klaus Høeck, Rejse l-V, publisher: Grevas; Denmark

Awards and honors

English language

Canada
 See 1973 Governor General's Awards for a complete list of winners and finalists for those awards.

United Kingdom
 Cholmondeley Award: Patric Dickinson, Philip Larkin
 Eric Gregory Award: John Beynon, Ian Caws, James Fenton, Keith Harris, David Howarth, Philip Pacey
 Queen's Gold Medal for Poetry: John Heath-Stubbs

United States
 Consultant in Poetry to the Library of Congress (later the post would be called "Poet Laureate Consultant in Poetry to the Library of Congress"): Daniel Hoffman appointed this year.
 American Academy of Arts and Letters Gold Medal in Poetry, John Crowe Ransom
 Bollingen Prize: James Merrill
 National Book Award for Poetry: A. R. Ammons, Collected Poems, 1951-1971
 Pulitzer Prize for Poetry: Maxine Kumin, Up Country
 Fellowship of the Academy of American Poets: W. S. Merwin

French language

France
 Max Jacob prize: Hubert Juin for Le Cinquième Poème
 Guillaume Apollinaire prize: Marc Alyn
 Grand Priz of the French Academy: André Frénaud
 Grand Aigle d'Or: Eugène Guillevic

Births
January 1 – Bryan Thao Worra, Laotian-American author, poet, and playwright
January 7 – Natalia Belchenko, Ukrainian poet and translator
 date not known:
 Ben Doyle (pen name: "Ben Dollar")
 Duo Yu, Chinese
 Sonnet L'Abbé, Canadian
 Paul Vermeersch, Canadian

Deaths
Birth years link to the corresponding "[year] in poetry" article:
 March 26 – Noël Coward, 73, English actor, playwright, poet and composer of popular music, of a heart attack
 May 20 – Charles Brasch, 63, New Zealand poet, literary editor and arts patron
 June 4 – Arna Bontemps, 70 (born 1902), American poet and member of the Harlem Renaissance, of a heart attack
 August 17 – Conrad Aiken, 84, of a heart attack
 September 2 – J. R. R. Tolkien, 81, English novelist, poet and academic
 September 16 – Víctor Jara, 40, Chilean writer, poet and Communist politician, by political murder
 September 20 – William Plomer, 69, South African-born British poet, novelist and literary editor, sometimes writing as Robert Pagan
 September 23 – Pablo Neruda, 69, Chilean writer, poet and Communist politician, from leukemia
 September 28 – W. H. Auden, 66, English poet, often cited as one of the most influential of the century
 October 17 – Ingeborg Bachmann (born 1926) Austrian poet and author
 November 22 – Ramon Guthrie, 77,
 November 23 – Francis Webb, 48, Australian poet
 November 24 – John G. Neihardt (born 1881), American author and poet
 December 11 – May Wedderburn Cannan, 80 (born 1893), English war poet
 December 14 – Josef Magnus Wehner, 82 (born 1891), German poet and playwright
 December 30 – Vagaland, pen name of Thomas Alexander Robertson, 64 (born 1909), Shetland Scottish poet
 date not known – Kenneth Allott, Welsh poet, academic, and authority on Matthew Arnold

See also

 Poetry
 List of poetry awards
 List of years in poetry

Notes

20th-century poetry

Poetry